Guru Amar Das (Gurmukhi: ਗੁਰੂ ਅਮਰ ਦਾਸ,; 5 May 1479 – 1 September 1574), sometimes spelled as Guru Amardas, was the third of the Ten Gurus of Sikhism and became Sikh Guru on 26 March 1552 at age 73.

Before becoming a Sikh (Shishya from Sanskrit), on a lovely pilgrimage after having been prompted to search for a guru, he heard his nephew's wife, Bibi Amro, reciting a hymn by Guru Nanak, and was deeply moved by it. Bibi Amro was the daughter of Guru Angad, the second and then current Guru of the Sikhs. Amar Das persuaded Bibi Amro to introduce him to her father  and in 1539, Amar Das, at the age of sixty, met Guru Angad and became a Sikh, devoting himself to the Guru. In 1552, before his death, Guru Angad appointed Amar Das as Guru Amar Das, the third Guru of Sikhism.

Guru Amar Das was an important innovator in the teachings of Guru who introduced a religious organization called the Manji system by appointing trained clergy, a system that expanded and survives into the contemporary era. He wrote and compiled hymns into a Pothi (book) that ultimately helped create the Adi Granth. 

Guru Amar Das remained the leader of the Sikhs till age 95, and named his son-in-law Bhai Jetha, later remembered by the name Guru Ram Das, as his successor.

Early life
Amar Das was born to mother Bakht Kaur (also known as Lakshmi or Rup Kaur) and father Tej Bhan Bhalla on 5 May 1479 in Basarke village in what is now called Amritsar district of Punjab (India). His family belonged to the Bhalla gotra (clan) of the Khatri caste. He married Mansa Devi and they had four children which they named Mohri, Mohan, Dani, and Bhani.

Amar Das had followed the Vaishnavism tradition of Hinduism for much of his life. reputed to have gone on some twenty pilgrimages into the Himalayas, to Haridwar on river Ganges. About 1539, on one such Hindu pilgrimage, he met a Hindu monk (sadhu) who asked him why he did not have a guru (teacher, spiritual counselor) and Amar Das decided to get one. On his return, he heard Bibi Amro, the daughter of the Sikh Guru Angad, singing a hymn by Guru Nanak. He learned from her about Guru Angad, and with her help met the second Guru of Sikhism and adopted him as his spiritual Guru who was much younger than his own age.

He is famous in the Sikh tradition for his relentless service to Guru Angad, with legends about waking up in the early hours and fetching water for his Guru's bath, cleaning and cooking for the volunteers with the Guru, as well devoting much time to meditation and prayers in the morning and evening.

Guruship
After eleven years most devoted service of the Guru and the sangats, Amar Das was nominated the third guru. Guru Amar Das moved to Goindwal situated not far away from Khadur on the bank of river Beas on the high road to Lahore, about 8 kilometres from Kapurthala and 45 kms. from Amritsar. He did so to avoid the pending conflict with Guru Angad's sons who had not approved of their supersession. Even at Goindwal he was harassed by one of the sons named Datu. He went to Goindwal and said: "Only yesterday thou wert a water-carrier in our house, and today thou sittest as a Guru. "Saying this he kicked the Guru off his seat. The Guru humbly said: "O great king, pardon me. Thou must have hurt thy foot." The Guru retired from Goindwal and hid himself in a house at Basarke, his home village. Datu set himself up as the Guru. Amar Das was persuaded by Baba Buddha to return, and Datu, finding no following, went back to Khadur.

Death
He died in 1574, in Goindwal Sahib, and like other Sikh Gurus he was cremated, with the "flowers" (remaining bones and ash after the cremation) immersed into  (flowing waters).

Teachings

Guru Amar Das taught with His own life the meaning of Guru Service, also known in Punjabi religious parlance as Guru Sewa. Guru Amar Das emphasized both spiritual pursuits as well as an ethical daily life. He encouraged his followers to wake up before dawn, do their ablutions and then meditate in silent seclusion. A good devotee, taught Amar Das, should be truthful, keep his mind in control, eat only when hungry, seek the company of pious men, worship the Lord, make an honest living, serve holy men, not covet another's wealth and never slander others. He recommended holy devotion with Guru's image in his follower's hearts.

He was also a reformer, and discouraged veiling of women's faces (a Muslim custom) as well as sati (a Hindu custom). He encouraged the Kshatriya people to fight in order to protect people and for the sake of justice, stating this is Dharma.

Influence
Religious organization
Guru Amar Das started the tradition of appointing manji (zones of religious administration with an appointed chief called sangatias), introduced the dasvandh ("the tenth" of income) system of revenue collection in the name of Guru and as pooled community religious resource, and the famed langar tradition of Sikhism where anyone, without discrimination of any kind, could get a free meal in a communal seating. He also started and inaugurated the 84-level step well called baoli at Goindval with a resting place, modeled along the lines of the Indian tradition of dharmsala, which then became a Sikh pilgrimage (tirath) center.

Akbar

He met the Mughal Emperor Akbar. According to the Sikh legend, he neither received Akbar nor was Akbar directly ushered to him, rather the Guru suggested that Akbar like everyone sit on the floor and eat in the langar with everyone before their first meeting. Akbar, who sought to encourage tolerance and acceptance across religious lines, readily accepted the suggestion. After the conclusion of the Langar, Akbar sat in the congregation with the rest of the sangat and asked the Guru a question. The Sikh hagiographies called janam-sakhis mention that Guru Amar Das persuaded Akbar to repeal the tax on Hindu pilgrims going to Haridwar.

Rituals in Sikhism: wedding, festivals,  funeral
Guru Amar Das composed the rapturous hymn called Anand and made it a part of the ritual of Sikh marriage called "Anand Karaj", which literally means "blissful event".

The Anand hymn is sung, in contemporary times, not only during Sikh weddings but also at major celebrations. Parts of the "Anand hymn" are recited in Sikh temples (Gurdwara) every evening, at the naming of a Sikh baby, as well as during a Sikh funeral. It is a section of the Anand Sahib composition of Guru Amar Das, printed on pages 917 to 922 of the Adi Granth and set to the "Ramkali" raga.

Guru Amar Das's entire Anand Sahib composition is a linguistic mix of Panjabi and Hindi languages, reflecting Guru Amar Das' upbringing and background. The hymn celebrates the freedom from suffering and anxiety, the union of the soul with the divine, describing a devotee's bliss achieved through the Guru with inner devotion and by repeating the Name of the Creator. The hymn states in stanza 19 that the Vedas teach "the Name is supreme", in stanza 27 that Smriti and Shastra discuss the good and the bad but are unreal because they lack a Guru and that it is the grace of the Guru which awakens the heart and the devotion to the Name. The hymn celebrates the life of a householder and constant  inner devotion to the One, ending each stanza with the characteristic "says Nanak".

Guru Amar Das is also credited in the Sikh tradition to have encouraged building of temples and places where Sikhs could gather together on festivals such as Maghi,
Diwali and Vaisakhi. He required his disciples to gather together for prayers and communal celebrations in autumn for Diwali and in spring for Vaisakhi, both post harvest ancient festivals of India.

Site of the Golden Temple
Guru Amar Das selected the site in Amritsar village for a special temple, that Guru Ram Das began building, Guru Arjan completed and inaugurated, and the Sikh Emperor Ranjit Singh gilded. This temple has evolved into the contemporary "Harimandir Sahib", or the temple of Hari (God), also known as the Golden Temple. It is the most sacred pilgrimage site in Sikhism.

Foundations and scripture
Scholars such as Pashaura Singh, Louis E. Fenech and William McLeod state that Guru Amar Das was influential in introducing "distinctive features, pilgrimages, festivals, temples and rituals" that ever since his time have been an integral part of Sikhism. He is also remembered as the innovator who began the collection of hymns now known as Goindwal Pothi or Mohan Pothi, the precursor to what became the Adi Granth – the first edition of Sikh scripture – under the fifth Sikh Master, which finally emerged as the Guru Granth Sahib under the tenth Sikh Master.Pashaura Singh (1996), Scriptural Adaptation in the Adi Granth, Journal of the American Academy of Religion, Oxford University Press, Volume 64, Number 2 (Summer 1996), pages 337–357 The nearly 900 hymns composed by Guru Amar Das constitute the third largest part, or about 15%, of the Guru Granth Sahib.

 In popular culture Guru Amardas'' is a 1979 documentary film, directed by Prem Prakash and produced by the Government of India's Films Division, covering his life and teachings.

Gallery

See also 

Bhakti
Bhakti movement
Dasam Granth
Japji

References

Amar Das
1479 births
1574 deaths
Punjabi people
1552 in India